Yorbe Vertessen (born 8 January 2001) is a Belgian professional footballer who plays as a forward for Union SG on loan from the Dutch club PSV.

Club career
Born in the Belgian town of Tienen, Vertessen joined PSV Eindhoven as a schoolboy from Westerlo in 2009.

On 2 May 2021, Vertessen scored his first goal for the PSV senior side in a 2–2 draw with SC Heerenveen in Eredivisie play. On 7 August 2021, Vertessen scored in a 4–0 Johan Cruyff Shield win over rivals Ajax, in turn helping to end Ajax's 17 game unbeaten streak.

On 28 January 2023, Vertessen was loaned to Union Saint-Gilloise until the end of the 2022–23 season, while Union were lying second in the Belgian Pro League, and made his debut in Union's 4-0 win over Zulte Waregem on 5 February 2023.

International career
Vertessen featured in the Belgium squad for the European Under-17 Championship in 2018, earning a place in the team of the tournament.

He was joint top scorer in the tournament alongside Italy's Edoardo Vergani, scoring in group stage wins over Ireland (2-0) and Bosnia and Herzegovina (4-0).

Further goals came in the 2-1 quarter-final win over Spain and the 1-2 semi-final falling at the hands of eventual winners Italy.

Career statistics

Honours
PSV

 KNVB Cup: 2021–22
 Johan Cruyff Shield: 2021
Individual

 UEFA European Under-17 Championship Team of the Tournament: 2018

References

External links

2001 births
People from Tienen
Footballers from Flemish Brabant
Living people
Belgian footballers
Association football forwards
Belgium youth international footballers
K.V.C. Westerlo players
PSV Eindhoven players
Jong PSV players
Royale Union Saint-Gilloise players
Eerste Divisie players
Eredivisie players
Belgian expatriate footballers
Belgian expatriate sportspeople in the Netherlands
Expatriate footballers in the Netherlands